The Bishop of North West Australia is the diocesan bishop of the Anglican Diocese of North West Australia.

List of Bishops of North West Australia
References

External links
 – official site

 
Lists of Anglican bishops and archbishops
Anglican bishops of North West Australia